Night Flight is an album by composer, arranger and conductor Gil Fuller featuring saxophonist James Moody recorded in 1965 and originally released on the Pacific Jazz label. The album was rereleased on CD combined with Gil Fuller & the Monterey Jazz Festival Orchestra featuring Dizzy Gillespie (Pacific Jazz, 1965) on the Blue Note label as Gil Fuller & the Monterey Jazz Festival Orchestra featuring Dizzy Gillespie & James Moody in 2008.

Track listing
All compositions by Gil Fuller except as indicated
 "Tin Tin Deo" (Gil Fuller, Chano Pozo) - 2:53 
 "I'm in the Mood for Love" (Dorothy Fields, Jimmy McHugh) - 3:36 
 "Night Flight" (Johnny Mangus) - 3:02 
 "Our Man Flint" (Jerry Goldsmith) - 3:01 
 "Seesaw" - 3:36 
 "Batucada Surgiu" (Marcos Valle, Paulo Sergio Valle) - 2:25 
 "17 Mile Drive" - 4:11 
 "A Patch of Blue" (Goldsmith) - 2:41 
 "Latin Lady" - 5:36 
 "Blues for a Debutante" - 2:34 
 "Sweets for My Sweet" (Doc Pomus, Mort Shuman) - 2:50 
 "Wild Chestnuts" (Bill Hood) - 2:20

Personnel
Gil Fuller - arranger, conductor
James Moody - flute, alto saxophone, tenor saxophone
Gabe Baltazar, Bill Green - alto saxophone
Ira Schulman, Clifford Scott - tenor saxophone
Bill Hood - baritone saxophone 
Conte Candoli, Chuck Foster, Melvin Moore, Al Porcino, Jimmy Zito  - trumpet
Sam Cassano, Alan Robinson, Gale Robinson - French horn
Lou Blackburn - trombone
Bob Enevoldsen - valve trombone
Ernie Tack - bass trombone
Mike Wofford - piano
George Samper - organ
Chuck Berghofer - bass 
Chuck Flores - drums
Francisco Aguabella - percussion

References

Pacific Jazz Records albums
Gil Fuller albums
James Moody (saxophonist) albums
1966 albums
Albums arranged by Gil Fuller
Albums conducted by Gil Fuller